The Makonie River is a river in Sudbury District in northeastern Ontario, Canada. It is in the James Bay drainage basin, and is a left tributary of the Chapleau River.

Course
The river begins in geographic Manning Township and flows northeast, passes northeast through the southeast corner of geographic Brutus Township, enters geographic Lipsett Township, and empties into Lipsett Lake. The river goes north and enters geographic Lloyd Township, heads northeast, and reaches Makonie Lake. The river flows east, enters geographic Bonar Township, heads northeast to Bonar Lake, then continues northeast and reaches its mouth at the Chapleau River. The Chapleau River flows via the Kapuskasing River, the Mattagami River and the Moose River to James Bay.

Tributaries
Stefansson Creek (left)
Kakanakwa Creek (left)

References

Sources

Rivers of Sudbury District